Kristoffer Lund Hansen (born 14 May 2002) is a Danish professional footballer who plays as a left-back for Häcken.

Career
Lund began playing football with the youth academy of Kerteminde, before joining Midtjylland's youth side at the age of 13. He signed his first professional contract with Midtjylland on 14 May 2017. He made his professional debut with them in a 2–1 Danish Cup win over Odense Boldklub on 11 February 2021. On 21 April 2021, he transferred to Esbjerg, signing a three-year contract. On 11 August 2021, before making an appearance with Esbjerg, he transferred to the Swedish club Häcken until 2024.

International career
Lund was born in Denmark to a Danish father and American mother. He is a youth international for Denmark, having represented the U17 to U19 teams.

Honours 
BK Häcken

 Allsvenskan: 2022

References

External links
 
 DBU Profile

2002 births
Living people
People from Kerteminde
Danish men's footballers
Denmark youth international footballers
Danish people of American descent
FC Midtjylland players
Esbjerg fB players
BK Häcken players
Danish Superliga players
Allsvenskan players
Association football fullbacks
Danish expatriate men's footballers
Danish expatriate sportspeople in Sweden
Expatriate footballers in Sweden